Marco Giustiniani may refer to:

Marco Giustiniani (bishop of Chios) (1547–1640), Roman Catholic bishop 
Marco Giustiniani (bishop of Verona) (died 1649), Italian Roman Catholic bishop
Marco Giustiniani (bishop of Torcello) (1655–1735), Italian Roman Catholic bishop